The following is the qualification system for the Athletics at the 2019 Pan American Games competition.

Qualification system
A total of 740 athletes will qualify to compete. Each nation may enter a maximum of two athletes in each individual event, and one team per relay event. Each event has a maximum number of competitors and a minimum performance standard. Peru as host nation, is granted an automatic athlete slot per event, in the event no one qualifies for that respective event.

The winner of each individual event (plus top two relay teams per event), from three regional qualification tournaments automatically qualified with the standard (even if not reached). If an event quota is not filled, athletes will be invited till the maximum number per event is reached.

For relays, each country can enter two relay only competitors to participate. The other members of each relay team  must be registered in an individual event. 

Qualifying standards must be achieved between 1 January 2018 and 23 June 2019.

Qualification timeline

Quota per event

Qualification standards

References

P
P
Qualification for the 2019 Pan American Games
Athletics at the 2019 Pan American Games